Levon Ananyan (13 October 1946 – 2 September 2013) was an Armenian journalist and translator.

Biography 
Born in Koghb, Tavush, Levon Ananyan was a graduate of the Yerevan State University, Department of Philology. He worked for a number of state journals. For approximately 25 years, he worked for the Garoun monthly.

In 1989, he became a member of the Writers Union of Armenia, and from 1990 – 2001 he was chief editor for Garoun.

In 2001, he was elected President of the Writers' Union of Armenia. He was re-elected as the RA Writers' Union chairman in 2009. He lectures at the Yerevan State University Department of Journalism. He was the president of the Noyemberyan NGO. He was also a member of the Journalists' Union.

He authored many articles on social and political issues, which have been printed in the state press. He also translated and published Russian and English books to the Armenian language; he founded "Apollo" Publishers.

Works

 Turmoil, Yerevan, 2004
 Drama on Stage and on the Screen, Yerevan, 1996
 Roots and Foliage, Yerevan, 1987

Translations From Russian and English to Armenian
 Contemporary Russian Statue, Yerevan, 2005
 Ray Bradbury's Fahrenheit 451, 1986

References

1946 births
People from Tavush Province
2013 deaths
Armenian journalists
Armenian translators
Yerevan State University alumni
21st-century Armenian male writers
20th-century translators
21st-century Armenian writers
20th-century Armenian writers
20th-century male writers